Schlösser is a surname. Notable persons with that name include:

 Karl Schlösser (1912–1982), German international footballer
 Louis Schlösser (1800–1886), German violinist and composer
 Rainer Schlösser (1899–1945), German journalist and writer
 Hans Müller-Schlösser (1884–1956), German poet and playwright

See also
 Schlosser
 Schlösser, German plural form of Schloss, a type of building

German-language surnames